Igor Ivanovych Zaseda (12 September 1932 – 5 November 2006) was a Ukrainian swimmer and writer. He competed in the 200 m breaststroke event at the 1956 Summer Olympics for the Soviet Union and finished in fifth place.

Biography
Zaseda was born in a village near Kharkiv, then studied in Mariupol and then moved to Kyiv, where he graduated from the Taras Shevchenko National University with a degree in journalism. He then worked as a sports commentator for a regional newspaper, and eventually became an established writer and president of the Kyiv Journalist Union. He was the author or co-author of 30 books, including five novels, some of which had been translated into multiple languages.

Zaseda was one of the organizers of the masters swimming movement in the Soviet Union, and competed himself since the first national championships in 1989. In total he won four national titles and set two national records in the 50 m (1989), 100 m (1990) and 200 m (1990, 1991) breaststroke events.

He was one of the first journalists to report on the Chernobyl disaster. While collecting material, he received a high dose of radiation (his car had to be disposed of due to radioactive contamination) that resulted in a prolonged illness and death in 2006.

Publications

References

1932 births
2006 deaths
People from Kharkiv Oblast
Ukrainian male breaststroke swimmers
Ukrainian writers
Soviet male breaststroke swimmers
Swimmers at the 1956 Summer Olympics
Olympic swimmers of the Soviet Union